Wonderlust is a live album by Heather Nova, released in 2000. The album was recorded live in Germany and includes a cover version of Bruce Springsteen’s "I'm on Fire" which has been described as a surprise. The whole sound has been noted as Nova '...possessing a fine backing band, but it's Nova's smooth then jagged vocals that steal the show'

Track listing
"Winterblue" – 5:58
"Walk This World" – 4:20
"Island" – 5:51
"Heart and Shoulder" – 4:18
"Paper Cup" – 3:59
"London Rain (Nothing Heals Me Like You Do)" – 4:13
"Not Only Human" – 5:15
"Doubled Up" – 3:42
"Truth and Bone" – 4:29
"I'm the Girl" – 5:28
"Heal" – 3:56
"Make You Mine" – 5:36
"Sugar" – 8:29
"I'm on Fire (Bruce Springsteen) – 3:43

Personnel
Heather Nova – vocals, guitar
Berit Fridahl – lead guitars
Bastian Juel – bass, backing vocals
Laurie Jenkins – drums
Nadia Lanman – cello
Felix Tod - mixing, recording

References

Heather Nova albums
2000 live albums
V2 Records live albums